The men's team in table tennis at the 2021 Asian Table Tennis Championships was held at Doha Hall from 28 September to 1 October 2021.

China did not participate at the event.

Schedule
All times are Arabia Standard Time (UTC+03:00)

Format
Teams were made up of three players(Some teams also had an additional player as a back up). Each team match was made up of five individual matches and ended when either side has won three matches. The order of a team match was as follows: a doubles match, two singles matches, and if neither side had won three matches by this point, a maximum of two extra singles matches were played.

First division

Group 1

Group 2

Group 3

Group 4

Group 5

Group 6

Main bracket

13th place bracket

19th place bracket

25th place bracket

Champion division

Main bracket 
Source:

5th place bracket 
Source:

Final standings

References 

2021 Asian Table Tennis Championships